Rzeczyca Wielka  (formerly German Reetz) is a village in the administrative district of Gmina Polanów, within Koszalin County, West Pomeranian Voivodeship, in north-western Poland.

For the history of the region, see History of Pomerania.

The village has a population of 300.

People 
 Theodor von Below (1765-1839), Prussian generalleutnant

References

Rzeczyca Wielka